Richard Earl Huntley (born September 18, 1972) is a former professional American football running back in the National Football League. He played six seasons for the Atlanta Falcons (1996), the Pittsburgh Steelers (1998–2000), the Carolina Panthers (2001), and the Detroit Lions (2002). He played college football at Winston-Salem State University.

1972 births
Living people
People from Monroe, North Carolina
Players of American football from North Carolina
American football running backs
Winston-Salem State Rams football players
Atlanta Falcons players
Pittsburgh Steelers players
Carolina Panthers players
Detroit Lions players